The 28th European Film Awards were presented on 12 December 2015 in Berlin, Germany. The winners were selected by more than 2,500 members of the European Film Academy.

Winners and nominees

European Film

European Comedy

European Documentary

European Animated Feature Film 2015

People's Choice Award for Best European Film

European Discovery – Prix FIPRESCI

European Director

European Screenwriter

European Actor

European Actress

European Cinematographer 2015 – Prix Carlo di Palma

European Editor 2015

European Production Designer 2015

European Costume Designer 2015

European Composer 2015

European Sound Designer 2015

European Co-Production Award — Prix Eurimages

European Achievement in World Cinema

Lifetime Achievement Award

Honorary Award of the EFA President and Board

Young Audience Award
Twelve- to fourteen-year-old audiences from across Europe voted for the winner after watching the three nominated films at special screenings held on "Young Audience Film Day" on 3 May.

European Short Film 2015
The nominees for Best Short Film were selected by independent juries at a series of film festivals throughout Europe.

References

External links 
 

2015 film awards
European Film Awards ceremonies
Culture in Berlin
2015 in German cinema
2015 in Europe
2015 in Berlin